Malaysia competed in the 1970 British Commonwealth Games held in Edinburgh, Scotland from 16 to 25 July 1970.

Medal summary

Medals by sport

Medallists

Badminton

Fencing

Three male fencers represented  Malaysia in fencing.

Weightlifting

Men

References

Malaysia at the Commonwealth Games
Nations at the 1970 British Commonwealth Games
1970 in Malaysian sport